The Fabulous Texan is a 1947 American Western film directed by Edward Ludwig and written by Lawrence Hazard and Horace McCoy. The film stars Wild Bill Elliott, John Carroll, Catherine McLeod, Albert Dekker, Andy Devine and Patricia Knight. The film was released on November 9, 1947, by Republic Pictures.

Plot

Cast
Wild Bill Elliott as Jim McWade 
John Carroll as John Wesley Baker
Catherine McLeod as Alice Sharp
Albert Dekker as Gibson Hart
Andy Devine as Elihu Mills
Patricia Knight as Josie Allen
Ruth Donnelly as Utopia Mills
Johnny Sands as Bud Clayton
Harry Davenport as Rev. Baker
Robert Barrat as Dr. Sharp 
Douglass Dumbrille as Luke Roland
Reed Hadley as Jessup
Roy Barcroft as Standifer
Russell Simpson as Wade Clayton
James Brown as Shep Clayton
Jim Davis as Sam Bass
George Beban Jr. as Dick Clayton 
John Miles as Sim Clayton

References

External links
 

1947 films
1940s English-language films
American Western (genre) films
1947 Western (genre) films
American black-and-white films
Republic Pictures films
Films directed by Edward Ludwig
1940s American films